Kanpur is a city in Uttar Pradesh, India.

Kanpur (or Kanapura) may also refer to:
 Kanpura, Rajasthan
 Kanapura, Karnataka
 Kanapuram, Andhra Pradesh, a village in Warangal district
 Kanpur district (disambiguation)
 Kanpur, Hooghly, a village in West Bengal, India

See also
 Khanpur (disambiguation)